The little crow (Corvus bennetti) is an Australian species of crow, very similar to the Torresian crow in having white bases to the neck and head feathers (shown when ruffled in strong wind) but slightly smaller (38–45 cm in length) and with a slightly smaller bill. It has the same white iris that distinguish the Australian species from all other Corvus except a few island species to the north of Australia, and one from Eurasia, the jackdaw (Corvus monedula). Like the Australian raven, this species has a blue ring around the pupil.

Distribution and habitat
It ranges over western and central Australia, often inhabiting very dry, near desert areas. It frequents small country towns and cultivated areas, where its flocks have reminded people of
the European rook.

Etymology 
C. bennetti was named in honour of the New South Wales ornithologist and collector of natural history specimens, Kenric Harold Bennett.

Behaviour

Diet
Its food is mainly taken from the ground and includes insects, cereals and other seeds. It is less of a scavenger than the Torresian crow.

Nesting
It usually nests in small, loose colonies, building stick nests lined with mud (the only Australian species of Corvid known to do this).

Call
The little crow's calls range from a harsh hark-hark-hark-hark to a more raven-like ah-ah-ah.

Image links
 Little Crow 1
 Little Crow 2
 Little crow series

References

 

little crow
little crow
Endemic birds of Australia
little crow
little crow